Deborah Norton is an English actress.

Personal life 
Deborah Norton was born in Croydon, Surrey, in 1944. She attended a Quaker boarding school and later studied at the Drama Centre London. She worked in Britain until she toured America with The Beggar's Opera. She later returned to the UK.

Career

Stage work 
Norton has taken part in productions of Six Degrees of Separation, Thérèse Raquin, The School for Scandal, and others in locations as diverse as the Royal Court, Bristol Old Vic, the Nottingham Playhouse, the National Theatre and others.

Television 
She has acted roles in many television productions, including Marta Dorf in the television miniseries Holocaust, and multiple roles in A Bit of Fry and Laurie, although she is perhaps best known for her role as the PM's adviser Dorothy Wainwright in Yes, Prime Minister.

Selected filmography
Holocaust (1978)
The Wildcats of St Trinian's (1980)
Play for Today (4 plays, 1976–1981)
Yes, Prime Minister (6 episodes, 1986–1988)
A Bit of Fry and Laurie (3 episodes, 1989)
Making Out (2 episodes, 1989)
Health and Efficiency (12 Episodes 1993 – 1995)
Chalk (1 Episode 1997)

Awards and Nominations 
Nominated for Best Actress for her work on Kennedy's Children by Plays and Players Magazine

Nominated for Best Supporting Actress for School For Scandal by the Manchester Evening News

External links

English television actresses
Living people
People from Croydon
1944 births
English stage actresses
Actresses from London
20th-century English actresses